The North Caucasian (Severokavkazskaya) is a general purpose pig breed from Russia and Uzbekistan.

External links
 http://www.fao.org/docrep/009/ah759e/AH759E08.htm

Pig breeds originating in Russia
Animal breeds originating in the Soviet Union